is a small round dumpling from the city of Akashi in Hyōgo Prefecture, Japan. The dumpling is made of an egg-rich batter and octopus dipped into dashi (a thin fish broth) before eating. Modern style akashiyaki first started selling in the Taishō period by a yatai shopper Seitarō Mukai. 

Although takoyaki, another Japanese dumpling, is more popular in Japan, it is based on akashiyaki. Both are made with a takoyaki pan, a type of frying pan or cooktop with many hemispherical molds. Compared to takoyaki, akashiyaki has a softer, more eggy texture.

Akashiyaki is shown in the cyberpunk visual novel video game Snatcher. In the English release, however, it was changed to "Neo Kobe Pizza", which people have actually gone to the effort of recreating.

History  
Akashiyaki used to be known as tamagoyaki (grilled egg) for a long time locally. However, around 1988, a city official renamed tamagoyaki to akashiyaki for purpose of promoting Akashi. The origin of the name is the decoration named Akashidama. It is one kind of artificial coral made by hardening egg whites with saltpeter, and it was used as decoration for kanzashi. From the end of the Edo period to the Taisho period, the production of Akashidama was thriving as a local industry in Akashi. 
It is said that people started making akashiyaki because there was a large amount of leftover egg yolk and wheat flour from the production sequence of Akashidama. In addition, Akashi city abounded with octopuses. Thus people started mixing those ingredients together and invented new cuisine – akashiyaki.

Seasons and Places to Eat 
Regardless of the season, akashiyaki is eaten as lunch and snack both at restaurants and at home. As of 2021, there are 70 akashiyaki places in Akashi city.

The Comparison with Takoyaki

See also

 Japanese cuisine
 List of dumplings
 Takoyaki

References

Dumplings
Japanese cuisine
Culture in Hyōgo Prefecture
Japanese egg dishes